Emmanuel Mbella (born 18 June 1992) is a Cameroonian professional footballer who plays as a winger for Macedonian club FK Renova.

Club career

Bylis Ballsh
On 9 August 2015. Mbella joined Albanian Superliga side Bylis Ballsh. On 30 August 2015, he making his debut in a 0–2 home defeat against Tërbuni Pukë after being named in the starting line-up.

Shkupi
On 23 March 2017, FIFA gives permission Mbella to play for Macedonian First Football League side Shkupi. On 2 April 2017, he making his debut in a 1–0 home win against Pelister after being named in the starting line-up.

Gjilani
On 26 January 2018, Mbella joined Football Superleague of Kosovo side Gjilani.

Sileks
On 7 June 2018, after just 5 months spent at Gjilani, Mbella returned to Macedonian Superleague and joined Sileks.

Ermis Aradippou
In June 2019, Mbella moved to Cyprus to join Ermis Aradippou FC. He signed a one-year deal.

References

External links

1992 births
Living people
People from Littoral Region (Cameroon)
Cameroonian emigrants to France
Naturalized citizens of France
French footballers
French expatriate footballers
French expatriate sportspeople in Romania
Expatriate footballers in Romania
French expatriate sportspeople in North Macedonia
Expatriate footballers in North Macedonia
French expatriate sportspeople in Cyprus
Expatriate footballers in Cyprus
Association football wingers
A.C. Monza players
Liga I players
CS Pandurii Târgu Jiu players
Liga II players
FC Gloria Buzău players
FC Botoșani players
LPS HD Clinceni players
SVN Zweibrücken players
Kategoria Superiore players
KF Bylis Ballsh players
Macedonian First Football League players
FK Shkupi players
FK Renova players
Football Superleague of Kosovo players
Ermis Aradippou FC players